Pierce is a given name. Notable people with the name include:

 Pierce A'Court-Ashe (1707–1768), British politician
 Pierce Askegren (1955–2006), American author
 Pierce M. Barron (1830–1887), American political figure
 Pierce Bird (born 1999), Northern Irish footballer
 Pierce Boshelly, American painter and sculptor
 Pierce Brodkorb (1908–1992), American ornithologist
 Pierce Brosnan (born 1953), Irish actor
 Pierce Brown (born 1988), American author
 Pierce Butler (1744–1822), Irish rice planter
 Pierce Cahill (1869–1935), American politician
 Pierce Dod (1683–1754), British physician
 Pierce H. Deamer Jr. (1907–1986), American politician 
 Pierce Egan (1772–1849), British journalist
 Pierce Egan the Younger (1814–1880), English journalist
 Pierce Freelon (born 1983), American politician
 Pierce Fulton (1992–2021), American DJ
 Pierce Gagnon (born 2005), American child actor
 Pierce Grace (1885–1966), Irish Gaelic footballer and hurler
 Pierce Holt (born 1962), American football player
 Pierce Homer (born 1956), American politician
 Pierce Johnson (born 1991), American baseball pitcher
 Pierce Knox (1921–1985), American marimba player
 Pierce Lacy (1872–1956), English stockbroker
 Pierce LePage (born 1996), Canadian Olympic athlete
 Pierce Lewis (1664–1699), Welsh cleric
 Pierce Lively (1921–2016), American judge
 Pierce Lyden (1908–1998), American actor
 Pierce McCan (1882–1919), Irish politician
 Pierce McKennon (1919–1947), American flying ace
 Pierce Meade (1776–1834), Anglican priest
 Pierce A. Morrissey (born 1870), American politician
 Pierce O'Brien-Butler (1877–1902), Irish rugby union player
 Pierce O'Leary (born 1959), Irish footballer
 Pierce Charles de Lacy O'Mahony (1850–1930), Irish politician
 Pierce Pettis (born 1954), American singer-songwriter
 Pierce Phillips (born 1992), English rugby union player
 Pierce Rafferty (born 1952), American film director
 Pierce Schenck (died 1930), American entrepreneur
 Pierce Galliard Smith (1826–1908), Scottish cleric
 Pierce Sweeney (born 1994), Irish footballer
 Pierce Tempest (1653–1717), English printseller
 Pierce Turner (born 1956), Irish singer
 Pierce Waring (born 1998), Australian footballer
 Pierce M. B. Young (1836–1896), American-Confederate politician

See also
Peirce (given name)
Pierce (surname)